Eden Brewery may refer to:

Eden Brewery St Andrews
Eden Brewery, Penrith